This is a list of Mexican football transfers in the Mexican Primera Division during the summer 2010 transfer window, grouped by club. Football has been played professionally in Mexico since the early 1900s. Since 1996, the country has played two split seasons instead of a traditional long season. There are two separate playoff and league divisions. After many years of calling the regular seasons as "Verano" (Summer) and "Invierno" (Winter); the Primera División de México (Mexican First League Division) have changed the names of the competition, and has opted for "Apertura" (opening) and "Clausura" (closing) events. The Apertura division begins in the middle of Mexico's summer and ends before the official start of winter. The Clausura division begins during the New Year, and concludes in the spring season.

Mexican Primera Division

America

In:

Out:

Atlante

In:

Out:

Atlas

In:

Out:

Chiapas

In:

Out:

Cruz Azul

In:

Out:

Guadalajara

In:

Out:

Monterrey

In:

Out:

Morelia

In:

Out:

Necaxa

In:

Out:

Pachuca

In:

Out:

Puebla

In:

Out:

Querétaro

In:

Out:

San Luis

In:

Out:

Santos Laguna

In:

Out:

(to Gimnasia LP)

(to La Piedad, on loan)
(to Durango, on loan)
(to San Luis, on loan)
(to Albinegros, on loan)
(to Mérida, on loan)
(to Jaguares, on loan)
(to Veracruz, on loan)
(to Guadalajara, loan return)

Toluca

In:

Out:

Estudiantes Tecos

In:

Out:

UANL

In:

Out:

UNAM

In:

Out:

See also 
 2010–11 Primera División de México season

References

Tran
Tran
Mexico
Summer 2010